is a 2007 video game published by Nintendo for the Nintendo DS video game console. The title was developed by Nintendo NSD (Network Service Development, Nintendo Co.) with programming assistance by
Agenda.

Nintendo developed the tilt sliding technology hardware accessory, and then co-developed the actual software with Agenda doing most of the software programming and JOE DOWN STUDIO handling the audio. Long time Nintendo creator Kazunobu Shimizu was responsible for creating the MagKid character and coming up with the concept of the game.  The retail SKU comes bundled with a new sliding controller that attaches to the DS, enabling it to slide on a surface as the input method. A localization outside Japan did not occur.

Slide Controller

The Slide Controller bundled with the game (and required to play) is attached to Slot 2, of the DS, which makes use of the technology of a computer's optical mouse, being that the pak emits red light from a LED light located at the bottom of the controller. In order to move the Mag Kid across the screen during the game, the player has to slide the whole Nintendo DS system with this controller (combined with a slant angle) on a table surface, thus given the name "Slide Controller".

References

External links
Official Nintendo Website
Official Nintendo Magazine
Official Agenda Website
Shoujo City 3D Mod
Game Console

2007 video games
Japan-exclusive video games
Nintendo DS games
Nintendo DS-only games
Nintendo games
Video games developed in Japan